Keith Rae may refer to:

 Keith Rae (British Army officer) (1919–2010)
 Keith Rae (footballer) (1917–2021), former Australian rules footballer